Josiah Hardage (November 20, 1869 – December 29, 1929) was an American politician. He was a member of the Arkansas House of Representatives, serving from 1919 to 1925. He was a member of the Democratic party.

References

1869 births
1929 deaths
People from Clark County, Arkansas
Speakers of the Arkansas House of Representatives
Democratic Party members of the Arkansas House of Representatives